is a retired Japanese football player who played as a midfielder.

Career
He attended Keio University, and gained experience with Tokyo Verdy in the 2013 J2 season. Recruited by Albirex Niigata, he became a professional player for his first team in 2016.

On 31 March 2021, 27-year old Hayama announced his retirement from football after a spell with Australian club Sydney Olympic FC.

Club career statistics
Updated to end of 2018 season.

References

External links
Profile at Albirex Niigata

Profile J. League

1993 births
Living people
Association football people from Tokyo
Japanese footballers
Japanese expatriate footballers
J1 League players
J2 League players
Tokyo Verdy players
Albirex Niigata players
Tochigi SC players
FC Machida Zelvia players
Sydney Olympic FC players
Association football midfielders
Universiade bronze medalists for Japan
Universiade medalists in football
Japanese expatriate sportspeople in Australia
Expatriate soccer players in Australia